The Sir Harry Range is a small mountain range in southwestern British Columbia, Canada, located on the west side of Huaskin Lake, between Grappler Sound and Seymour Inlet, north of Port McNeill. It has an area of 18 km2 and is a subrange of the Pacific Ranges which in turn form part of the Coast Mountains.  The range was named for Sir Harry Verney whose son, Sir Edmund Verney commanded  while stationed at the Pacific Station from 1862 to 1866.

See also
List of mountain ranges

References

Pacific Ranges